The topazes are two species of hummingbirds in the genus Topaza. They are found in humid forests in the Amazon Basin. Males are by far the largest hummingbirds in their range – the giant hummingbird of the Andes is the only larger species in the family. They are colourful, being mainly strongly iridescent golden and crimson with a black hood and a green throat. Females lack the elongated rectrices and have a mainly green plumage.

Taxonomy
The genus Topaz was introduced by the English zoologist George Robert Gray in 1840 
with the crimson topaz as the type species. The genus contains two species, the crimson topaz and the fiery topaz. Although generally considered to be distinct species, they have in the past been thought to be conspecific by some authors.

References

Further reading
 Restall, R., C. Rodner, & M. Lentino (2006). Birds of Northern South America. Christopher Helm, London.  (vol. 1),  (vol. 2).

Taxa named by George Robert Gray
Taxonomy articles created by Polbot